The Roussen class is a seven-strong class of British-designed fast attack missile boats improved and customized for the Hellenic Navy, also known as Super Vita. The class is named after its lead ship, which in turn is named after Lt Nikolaos Roussen, a World War II submarines officer who was killed in the suppression of the Navy mutiny in April 1944.

History

The modernization program of the Hellenic Navy in the late 1990s included the construction of three modern missile boats and was signed in January 2000. The construction took place at the Elefsis Shipyards, while Vosper Thornycroft (now BAE Systems Surface Ships) provided the necessary design, logistical support and equipment for the ships.
In August 2003 and September 2008 options that provided for the acquisition of four more vessels were taken up with the last ship to be commissioned in 2015.

On 25 September 2008, a 299 million Euro contract was signed between the Greek State and the Elefsis Shipyards for the construction of the two remaining vessels of the class, P-78 and P-79. According to the contract, the delivery times of the two FACs were 46 months from the start of the contract for the first ship and 52 months for the second. Due to serious financial problems of the shipyards and the Greek state, there has been a 10 year delay in the construction of the two ships. In 2016 the Greek government decided that the Hellenic Navy should undertake the completion of the construction of the two vessels. The plan was that the two vessels should have been launched not later then 18 months after the signing of the contract and that they should have been delivered in the navy not later then 2019. In 2017, in a statement of Deputy Defense Minister D. Vitsas there were hopes that the construction would have finished in mid 2018. Finally, on 1 June 2018, the launch of the 6th Super Vita P-78 took place at the Elefsina Shipyards. With a ceremony held on 28 July 2020, the 6th vessel was officially commissioned into the Hellenic Navy. The 7th vessel was launched on 5 August 2020 and commissioned on 29 September 2022. An eighth ship was revealed in January 2021. Although there hasn't been an order yet.

In September 2020, the UK offered to build eight boats of the same design for Ukraine.

Design
The plans of the Roussen Class missile boats are based on smaller Vita class boats serving in the navies of Qatar, as well as similar size vessels built for Oman and other countries.
The hull is made of steel and the superstructure is made of Aluminum, while the company Vosper Thornycroft (now BAE Systems Surface Ships) provides the electricity transmission system, the management board, electrical equipment and systems countermeasures.

Weapons and electronics

The main armament of the ships are eight Exocet MM40 Block II/III anti-ship missiles with a range of up to 70/180 km respectively. They are complemented by an Otobreda 76 mm naval gun in the bow and two smaller 30mm cannons as secondary weapons located on the ships' superstructure. The vessel's primary anti-air and anti-missile weapon is the RIM-116 RAM missile system which comprises an onboard Mk-31 launcher with 21 projectiles, as well as the DR3000 electronic support measures system and the Mk36 SRBOC decoy launcher.

The sensor suite responsible for the timely identification and homing of surface and air targets includes the MW08 3D G-band surveillance radar, the Mirador electro-optical target tracker and the Scout MkII low probability of intercept radar which is being controlled by the TACTICOS combat management system.

Ships
The ships of this class are named after junior officers of the Hellenic Navy who have been killed in action. They are:

Similar ships
Sa'ar 4.5-class missile boat
Houbei class missile boat
Skjold class patrol boat
Hamina class missile boat

Gallery

References

Sources 
 
 

Missile boat classes
Missile boats of the United Kingdom
Missile boats of the Hellenic Navy